Pansemal is a town and a nagar panchayat in Barwani district in the Indian state of Madhya Pradesh.

Geography
It has an average elevation of 242 metres (793 feet).

Demographics
 India census, Pansemal had a population of 10,745. Males constitute 52% of the population and females 48%. Pansemal has an average literacy rate of 59%, lower than the national average of 59.5%: male literacy is 68%, and female literacy is 49%. In Pansemal, 17% of the population is under 6 years of age.

Notable people

 Bala Bachchan (Former Home Minister)

References

Cities and towns in Barwani district
Barwani